Celine Van Gestel (born 7 November 1997) is a Belgian volleyball player, playing as an outside-spiker.

She is part of the Belgium women's national volleyball team. She competed at the 2022 FIVB Volleyball Women's World Championship.

She competed at the 2015 Women's European Volleyball Championship. On club level she played for Asterix Kieldrecht, Allianz MTV Stuttgart, and Il Bisonte Firenze.

References

External links
http://worldgrandprix.2016.fivb.com/en/group1/competition/teams/bel-belgium/players/celine-van-gestel?id=51506
http://worldgrandprix.2015.fivb.com/en/preliminary-round-group1/competition/teams/bel-belgium/players/celine-van-gestel?id=44690
http://www.scoresway.com/?sport=volleyball&page=player&id=13575
https://web.archive.org/web/20160925073143/http://www.cev.lu/Competition-Area/PlayerDetails.aspx?TeamID=9729&PlayerID=34068&ID=837

1997 births
Living people
Belgian women's volleyball players
Place of birth missing (living people)
Wing spikers
21st-century Belgian women